Haris Khan (born 17 January 1989) is a Canadian comedian. Over the years, he has become known for his ethnically diverse humour, and for his charitable works.

Early life 
Khan was born in Pakistan, raised in the Middle East & moved to Canada when he was a teenager. Ever since debuting on the comedy stage in 2010, Haris Khan has performed throughout North America, Europe and the Middle East.

Career 
Khan's first solo International tour (Haris Khan & Friends Tour), had sold out shows in Canada, USA, Oman, Pakistan and UAE. He represented Canada Internationally. He is among the few of non-Aboriginal comedians who had performed on First Nation reserves in Canada.

Notable performances 
Haris acted in the TV show Little Mosque on The Prairies and few others shows.

Others 
In additional to performing as a stand-up comedian, Khan had organized fundraisers events and campaigns to support charitable organizations in Canada.

Comedic style 
Haris's stand-up performances feature ethnic humour to highlight ideas, beliefs or stereotypes about racial or ethnic groups. He often refers to his own experiences growing up in a Pakistani Canadian family.

Personal life 
Haris lives in Regina, Saskatchewan. Both of his parents died due to COVID19 outside of Saskatchewan. On Jan.15, two days before Khan's birthday, his dad passed away in hospital. Haris Khan began project to feed others during Ramadan in honour of his late father

Education 
Khan had graduated from University of Regina with a bachelor of science degree. While studying at the university he served as the elected Vice President of External Affairs and later as the President & CEO of the University of Regina Student Union.

Religious beliefs 
Haris Khan is a Muslim.

References

External links 

 
 Khan awarded CBC Future 40

Living people
20th-century Canadian comedians
20th-century Canadian male actors
21st-century Canadian comedians
21st-century Canadian male actors
Canadian Internet celebrities
Canadian male comedians
Canadian male film actors
Canadian male radio actors
Canadian male television actors
Canadian male voice actors
Canadian stand-up comedians
Comedians from Karachi
Comedians from Saskatchewan
Pakistani emigrants to Canada
Male actors from Karachi
Male actors from Regina, Saskatchewan
University of Regina alumni
1989 births